Golden City may refer to:

Places
Golden, Colorado, originally named Golden City 
Golden City, Missouri, a city in Golden City Township, Barton County, Missouri, United States
Golden City Township, Barton County, Missouri, a township in Barton County, Missouri, United States

Colloquial names
Cities in Victoria, Australia, nicknamed "Golden City" due to their gold production during the Victorian Gold rush
Ballarat 
Bendigo
Chrysopolis or Golden City, former name of Üsküdar, Istanbul
Jaisalmer, Rajasthan, India
Koduvally, Kerala, India
Kolar, "The Golden city of India", Karnataka, India
Prague, the capital of Czech Republic, commonly referred to as Zlatá Praha (Golden Prague)
Golden City, a nickname for San Francisco
Sonipat, a city in Haryana, India, known as Swarnprastha (Golden City) in ancient times

Fictional places
Golden City (comics), a fictional city that appears in comic books published by Dark Horse Comics

Other
The Golden City, book on architecture by Henry Hope Reed, Jr.
The Golden City (novel), the third in Fourth Realm Trilogy of dystopian novels by John Twelve Hawks
Die goldene Stadt, a German film 1941 
The Golden City, a city of the Lego Exo-Force toy line
Golden City 1 railway station, Biñan City, Laguna, Philippines
Golden City 2 railway station, Santa Rosa City, Laguna, Philippines

See also
City of Gold (disambiguation)
Gold City, a gospel group